The Homelessness Act 2002 is an Act of Parliament in the United Kingdom. It amends the Housing Act 1996 and sets out the duties owed by local housing authorities to someone who is homeless or threatened with homelessness.

References

Housing in the United Kingdom
United Kingdom Acts of Parliament 2002
Homelessness and law
Homelessness in the United Kingdom